Dionysius of Cyrene, lived c. 150 BC, was a Stoic philosopher and mathematician. 

He was a pupil of Diogenes of Babylon and Antipater of Tarsus.

He was famed as a mathematician, and he is probably the Dionysius whose arguments are attacked by Philodemus in his book On Signs, where Dionysius is reported as arguing that the Sun must be very large because it reappears slowly from behind an obstruction.

Notes

Hellenistic-era philosophers from Africa
Stoic philosophers
2nd-century BC Greek people
2nd-century BC philosophers